A norepinephrine–dopamine reuptake inhibitor (NDRI) is a drug used for the treatment of clinical depression, attention deficit hyperactivity disorder (ADHD), narcolepsy, and the management of Parkinson's disease. The drug acts as a reuptake inhibitor for the neurotransmitters norepinephrine and dopamine by blocking the action of the norepinephrine transporter (NET) and the dopamine transporter (DAT), respectively. This in turn leads to increased extracellular concentrations of both norepinephrine and dopamine and, therefore, an increase in adrenergic and dopaminergic neurotransmission.

A closely related type of drug is a norepinephrine–dopamine releasing agent (NDRA).

List of NDRIs

Many NDRIs exist, including the following:

Amphetamine and many of its immediate derivatives (i.e., the substituted amphetamines) are also both non-competitive and competitive inhibitors of the dopamine transporter (DAT), norepinephrine transporter (NET), and serotonin transporter (SERT) proteins. Amphetamine itself has comparatively low affinity for SERT relative to DAT and NET. Consequently, amphetamine is usually classified as an NDRI instead of an SNDRI. However, the substituted amphetamines have a very diverse effects profile, and many of them have significant inhibiting effects on the SERT.

Amphetamine and many of the other substituted amphetamines are inhibitors of VMAT2 and potent agonists of the trace amine-associated receptor 1 (TAAR1); agonism of TAAR1 triggers phosphorylation events that result in both non-competitive reuptake inhibition and reversed transport direction of monoamine transporter proteins.  As a result, monoamines flow out of the cell and into the synaptic cleft. Thus, amphetamine and its derivatives have a pharmacological profile that is much different than classical NDRIs, but analogous to trace amines.

Research compounds

See also
 Monoamine reuptake inhibitor
 Dopamine reuptake inhibitor
 Norepinephrine reuptake inhibitor

References